Coralee Elliott Testar UE (born February 1946 in Prince Edward Island) is a Vancouver based producer and screenwriter. She is a graduate of the National Theatre School of Canada.  Her many credits include the award-winning The Little Kidnappers (Disney), "City Boy" (Bonneville/PBS) based on the novel Freckles, and the television adaptation of Girl of the Limberlost (PBS).

Testar is a past president of the British Columbia Motion Picture Industry Association and a lifetime member of the Writers Guild of Canada.

External links
 

1946 births
Living people
20th-century Canadian screenwriters
Writers from Vancouver
Canadian women screenwriters
National Theatre School of Canada alumni
20th-century Canadian women writers
21st-century Canadian screenwriters
21st-century Canadian women writers